

Economics
In economics, a price book is a book in which the normal prices of an item are listed for all suppliers. This allows one to determine the lowest price possible.

If a group of suppliers adhere to a particular price book, in other words, they set the prices of the price book artificially higher than the market clearing price, then they are "fixing the price" of that item. This is illegal in most countries and is often found in oligopolies (industries with a few competitors (2-8), but not enough to make it a perfect market).

Construction industry
In construction a price book is used to estimate the cost of work. Historically the Carpenters' Company of the City and County of Philadelphia used their price book to control prices.

References

Pricing